Bioinformatics and Biology Insights  is a peer-reviewed open access academic journal focusing on the application of bioinformatics to biological research.  The journal was originally published by Libertas Academica, but SAGE Publications became the publisher in September 2016.  The journal is edited by Erich Bornberg-Bauer.

Abstracting and indexing
The journal is indexed in
Emerging Sources Citation Index
PubMed/PubMed Central
Scopus
Selected EBSCO, Elsevier, & Gale databases

References

External links

Bioinformatics and computational biology journals
SAGE Publishing academic journals
English-language journals
Open access journals